Secret Weapon is eighth studio album by punk rock band MxPx and is considered a "back to roots" album for the group.

Secret Weapon is available in three different versions:
 The standard version with 16 tracks
 A double 12-inch vinyl version with special artwork
 A special edition with a "Making of..." DVD, new artwork, and three extra tracks

Background
On November 7, 2006, it was announced the group had re-signed with Tooth & Nail Records. In February 2007, the band revealed they were aiming to release an album through the label by mid-2007.

Release
On May 2, 2007, Secret Weapon was announced for release. In the same announcement, the album's track listing was revealed, and the title track was made available for streaming. In May and June, the band headlined the Tooth & Nail Tour with support from the Classic Crime, the Fold, Sullivan, Run Kid Run, Hawk Nelson and Project 86. The album received much online publicity before its release, much due to MxPx's return to Tooth and Nail Records.

On July 5, 2007, a music video was released for "Secret Weapon". Secret Weapon was made available for streaming on July 10, before being released a week later through Tooth & Nail Records. The group performed a week's worth of shows on the 2007 edition of Warped Tour between late July and early August. "You're on Fire" was released to radio on August 21. A music video was released for "Shut It Down" on November 19, 2007. In January 2008, the band toured Japan and Indonesia, prior to a stint in Australia. They was originally scheduled to support Yellowcard in March and April 2008, however, they had to pull out due to scheduling conflicts. Instead, the band toured across the US with Chiodos in April 2008 and appeared at the Bamboozle Left festival. Following this, the band toured with the Colour Fred, until May 2008. On September 5, a music video was released for "Contention". In September and October 2008, the band went on a co-headlining US tour with Lagwagon; they were supported by Only Crime and TAT.

Reception

The album debuted at No. 76 on the Billboard 200; it also went to No. 1 on the Billboard's Christian chart. In 2008, the album was nominated for a Dove Award for Rock Album of the Year at the 39th GMA Dove Awards.

Track listing
All songs written by Mike Herrera.

Vinyl and special edition tracks
In addition to the 16 tracks included on all versions of the album, the special editions come with 3 additional tracks:

Personnel
 Mike Herrera – lead vocals, bass
 Tom Wisniewski – guitars, backing vocals
 Yuri Ruley – drums

References

MxPx albums
2007 albums
Albums produced by Aaron Sprinkle
Tooth & Nail Records albums